Aioliops is a genus of dartfishes native to the central western Pacific Ocean.

Species
There are currently four recognized species in this genus:
 Aioliops brachypterus Rennis & Hoese, 1987 (Shortfin minidartfish)
 Aioliops megastigma Rennis & Hoese, 1987 (Bigspot minidartfish)
 Aioliops novaeguineae Rennis & Hoese, 1987 (New guinea minidartfish)
 Aioliops tetrophthalmus Rennis & Hoese, 1987

References

Microdesmidae
Gobiidae